Gómez Plata is a town and municipality in the Colombian department of Antioquia. Part of the subregion of Northern Antioquia.

Climate
Gómez Plata has a cool tropical rainforest climate (Af) due to altitude. It has very heavy rainfall year round.

References

Municipalities of Antioquia Department